This is a list of Bonaire clubs in North American competitions. Bonaire clubs have participated in competitive international football competitions since 2018, when Real Rincon entered the 2018 Caribbean Club Shield.

No club from Bonaire has won a CONCACAF or CFU competition.

Who qualifies for CONCACAF competitions 
Since 2018, the winner of the Bonaire Kampionato, the top tier of football on the island qualifies for the Caribbean Club Shield, a tertiary knockout tournament for developing Caribbean football nations. This competition is held in the spring. This also serves as a qualifying tournament for the CONCACAF League, which is played in the fall. The CONCACAF League is the secondary association football competition for club football in North America. Should a team finish in the top six standings of the CONCACAF League, they qualify for the CONCACAF Champions League, which is played the following winter.

In order for a Bonaire team to reach the Champions League, they would need to win the Caribbean Club Shield and then earn a top six finish in the CONCACAF League.

Results by competition

CFU Club Shield

CFU Club Championship

Appearances in CONCACAF competitions

References

External links 
 RSSSF International Club Results for North America
 Bonaire - List of Champions, RSSSF.com

 
North American football clubs in international competitions